Nandar may refer to:
Nandar-e Bala
It may also refer to:

 Nandar (activist), a feminist activist in Myanmar